Bradin Carl Hagens (born May 12, 1989) is an American professional baseball pitcher for the Rakuten Monkeys of the Chinese Professional Baseball League (CPBL). He has played in Major League Baseball (MLB) for the Arizona Diamondbacks and for the Hiroshima Toyo Carp of Nippon Professional Baseball.

Career

Arizona Diamondbacks
Hagens was drafted by the Arizona Diamondbacks in the sixth round of the 2009 Major League Baseball Draft out of Merced College. He was called up to the majors for the first time and made his debut on August 14, 2014. Hagens was optioned back to the AAA Reno Aces on August 18, after making two appearances with the Diamondbacks. He was outrighted off the Diamondbacks roster on August 21, 2014.

Tampa Bay Rays
He was traded to the Tampa Bay Rays on April 4, 2015. He elected free agency on November 6, 2015.

Hiroshima Toyo Carp
In 2016 he signed for Hiroshima Carp of Japan.

Second stint with Diamondbacks
On February 16, 2018, Hagens returned stateside and signed a minor league deal with the Arizona Diamondbacks. He elected free agency on November 3, 2018.

Fargo-Moorhead RedHawks
On April 1, 2019, Hagens signed with the Fargo-Moorhead RedHawks of the American Association.

Third stint with Diamondbacks
On May 20, 2019, Hagens's contract was purchased by the Arizona Diamondbacks and he was assigned to the Triple-A Reno Aces. He elected free agency on November 7, 2019.

Second stint with RedHawks
On March 18, 2020, Hagens signed with the Fargo-Moorhead RedHawks of the American Association of Independent Professional Baseball

Rakuten Monkeys
On December 30, 2020, Hagens signed with the Rakuten Monkeys of the Chinese Professional Baseball League. On September 20, 2021, Hagens set a CPBL record with 25 consecutive scoreless appearances without allowing a run.
On December 13, 2021 the CPBL announced Hagens as a Gold Glove winner for the 2021 season. On January 8, 2022, Hagens re-signed with the Monkeys for the 2022 season.

References

External links

1989 births
Living people
American expatriate baseball players in Japan
American expatriate baseball players in Mexico
American expatriate baseball players in Taiwan
American people of Dutch descent
Arizona Diamondbacks players
Arizona League Diamondbacks players
Baseball players from California
Cañeros de Los Mochis players
Durham Bulls players
Fargo-Moorhead RedHawks players
Hiroshima Toyo Carp players
Indios de Mayagüez players
Merced Blue Devils baseball players
Merced College alumni
Missoula Osprey players
Mobile BayBears players
Montgomery Biscuits players
Nippon Professional Baseball pitchers
Rakuten Monkeys players
Reno Aces players
South Bend Silver Hawks players
Sportspeople from Modesto, California
Visalia Rawhide players